h3h3Productions is a controversial YouTube channel created and hosted by Ethan Klein and Hila Klein, an Israeli-American husband-and-wife duo. Their content consists of reaction videos and sketch comedy in which they satirize internet culture. The H3 Podcast is their podcast channel that has been running since 2017 and has been the subject of various controversies and offenses, resulting in its banning at times.

History

h3h3Productions
h3h3Productions is a YouTube channel  launched in 2011 by Ethan and Hila Klein, an American and Israeli husband and wife duo. The primary format of videos uploaded to the channel involve the Kleins critique and commentary reaction videos, with clips of a source video intermixed with commentary and absurd, at times offensive and controversial sketches which fall into a style which has been described as a cross between the works of comedy duo Tim & Eric and the comedic series Mystery Science Theater 3000. The Klein's audience is a loyal fanbase of followers who thrive on the in-your-face style of humor, and the style has evolved over time to be more and more offensive as noted in the Musk impersonation which resulted in the channel being banned.

The channel has gained a reputation for critiquing internet trends and a range of online personalities and several YouTube policies. The Kleins have reacted to several online controversies, many of which result from poorly received, offensive commentary and prank videos which the host on their YouTube channel. The Kleins have been noted for criticizing YouTube channels that entice young viewers to participate in online gambling related to the video game Counter-Strike: Global Offensive, mainly by trading skins for real-world currency. The Kleins have not uploaded a video to their h3h3Productions YouTube channel since 2020 and have said on their podcasts that they are unlikely to regularly make h3h3Productions-style videos again.

H3 Podcast
The H3 Podcast which was originally streamed on Twitch before being moved to YouTube in April 2017. Its first episode was uploaded to the H3 Podcast YouTube channel on April 7, 2017, featuring Justin Roiland, co-creator of Rick and Morty. Klein has since withdrawn his close ties with Roiland after in January 2023 Roiland was found to be a perpetrator of both domestic violence and toxic workplace behaviors as noted by his sending of lewd messages to females in the workplace.  

The podcast began with conversational interviews with notable internet personalities such as PewDiePie, Post Malone and Jake Paul. Also in 2017 the Kleins created the channel H3 Podcast Highlights which posts edited sections of podcast episodes.  The podcast also is an effective cross-sell channel for Hila Klein's Teddy Fresh brand, with fans lining up to purchase new clothing.

The channel has since launched several new podcasts called H3 After Dark, H3TV and Off The Rails, all of which currently have new episodes being uploaded on a weekly basis. Furthermore, Ethan Klein has co-hosted Frenemies, Families and Leftovers - the first two of which have since ended. The current cast of the podcast consists of Ethan and Hila Klein and several crew members.

Frenemies was a podcast discussing internet drama, co-hosted by YouTube personality, Trisha Paytas, before they quit. On the set of Frenemies, Ethan and Paytas' relationship was initially rocky, marked by several large clashes, but they began reconciling their differences in  episodes with Dr. Drew. Several Frenemies episodes focused on sexual assault allegations surrounding David Dobrik and The Vlog Squad. Totaling 42 episodes, Frenemies ended in June 2021 after Paytas voiced their disagreements with Ethan and the podcast's production. While the podcast received praise for its openness regarding mental illness and was credited for helping break down the social stigma surrounding it, Paytas' comments on Judaism and the Holocaust in particular have been criticized as ignorant and offensive.

The Families podcast was created in response to Paytas unexpectedly quitting Frenemies. Families, which also discussed internet drama as well as focused on Ethan's relationship with his parents, was co-hosted by his mother, Donna Klein and featured his father, Gary Klein.

In September 2021, Leftovers, a left-leaning political podcast co-hosted by Hasan Piker and Ethan, was launched. Tubefilter reported that the first episode reached 1 million views a day after being published.

The H3 Podcast has been one of the United States' highest ranking podcasts since late 2020. Radio Online noted a surge in listenership in early 2021, presumably in large part due to attention the public disputes between Ethan and Paytas garnered surrounding Frenemies. Media Monitors ranked the podcast 12th for the second quarter of 2021. In the third quarter of 2021, the podcast was ranked 21st by audience size and 27th by reach in the United States by Edison Research.

Controversies and lawsuits

Allegations against The Wall Street Journal
h3h3Productions, alongside several other channels, supported YouTube personality PewDiePie amid a 2017 controversy over jokes about Nazis in one of his videos from January. On February 14, The Wall Street Journal ran a story about PewDiePie's previous references to Adolf Hitler, which brought nine other videos into the debate and elicited frequent discussions on whether media took them out of context. When YouTube subsequently released tools to allow advertisers to avoid offensive videos, Ethan claimed that the tools were overly broad and negatively affected unrelated content, including his own channel.

One of the authors of the Wall Street Journal piece, Jack Nicas, wrote another article on March 24 claiming YouTube did not go far enough to prevent advertising from displaying on videos that might contain racist content. Ethan accused the report of being written selectively to maximize outrage. The article showed a Coca-Cola advert playing on a video of the white supremacist country song "Alabama Nigger" by American band Trashy White Band. Upon seeing that the video was not contributing to the uploader's income, Ethan alleged that Nicas had used an altered screenshot. Hours later, he was informed that the video was indeed monetized, but on behalf of a copyright claim rather than at the choice or to the benefit of the uploader. He withdrew his accusation in response, and The Wall Street Journal released a statement that it stood by the authenticity of the screenshots.

Hosseinzadeh v. Klein 
In April 2016, Matt Hosseinzadeh, an American YouTube personality who goes by "MattHossZone" and "Bold Guy", filed a civil action against the Kleins for copyright infringement in a video on the h3h3Productions channel. Hosseinzadeh claims that he initially contacted the Kleins "to politely ask them to remove [his] content from their video" but that they refused. His lawyer claimed that the video used more than 70% of his work "while contributing nothing substantive to it".

After a video on this was released by h3h3Productions the following month, fellow YouTuber Philip DeFranco started a fundraiser on GoFundMe to help raise money for the Kleins' legal fees, citing the need to protect fair use on YouTube. On May 26, 2016, the Kleins announced that the $130,000 raised will go into an escrow account called the "Fair Use Protection Account" (FUPA), overseen by law firm Morrison & Lee LLP and to be used to help people defend fair use.

The Kleins won the lawsuit, with U.S. District Judge Katherine B. Forrest ruling that their commentary video constituted "fair use as a matter of law" and describing it as "quintessential comment and criticism". The case is the first of its kind to receive a judgment; while not legally binding across the United States, it provided a significant and persuasive argument to be cited in future cases relating to fair use on YouTube.

Triller Fight Club II LLC v. The H3 Podcast 
In May 2021, Triller's event company filed an updated lawsuit to the US District Court for the Central District of California against the H3 Podcast and the Kleins, seeking $50 million in damages. The lawsuit alleged copyright infringement in the now deleted podcast episode titled Jake Paul Fight Was a Disaster, which aired five days after the Jake Paul vs. Ben Askren fight and featured knockout footage along with Ethan's commentary on the event.

Triller has now filed four separate lawsuits against Klein for the Paul vs. Askren fight, as well as alleged defamation through the Klein's podcast. The first to be thrown out was the suit over a joke Klein made, stating that Triller advertised Kevin Hart, when he was nowhere to be found on the app. The court deemed that this was not in fact defamation, as it was clearly a parody. Klein then filed an anti-SLAPP, which was granted, meaning that the case is thrown out for prejudice, and Kavanaugh is now responsible to pay Klein's attorney's fees, which Klein mentions to be upwards of $60,000 USD. 

The second suit to be thrown out was regarding Klein's website, 'Does Ryan Kavanaugh look like Harvey Weinstein?, which shows as the second result when Ryan Kavanaugh is typed into Google Search. Kavanaugh filed this suit for cybersquatting, meaning he believed that Klein registered this domain name in hopes of selling it for profit. This suit was thrown out for being improper in January 2022.

Two lawsuits still remain for Klein, including copyright infringement regarding the streaming of the Paul vs. Askren fight on the H3 Podcast, and a personal defamation suit where Kavanaugh alleges that Klein used his podcast and SEO to harm Kavanaugh's reputation. 

In one of Klein's recent livestreams on the H3 Podcast, published on 8 February 2023, he mentions an update on Kavanaugh's defamation case against him. Klein mentions that he filed an anti-SLAPP, which was denied by the judge. Klein has since filed an appeal for the denial of the anti-SLAPP, which if approved, will be brought up to a higher appellate court and seen by a panel of three judges, all experts on the anti-SLAPP law.

YouTube suspensions 
In May 2022, the H3 podcast channel was suspended when Ethan said "someone should bomb" an NRA convention. In October 2022, the same channel received a strike and one week suspension following comments directed at Jewish conservative political commentator Ben Shapiro, in which Ethan stated he hoped Shapiro would be the first to be "gassed" in the event of a second Holocaust. In his podcast Ethan said, “If there’s another Holocaust and people start rounding up the Jews again I hope Ben gets gassed first. Or last”. In a statement, a YouTube spokesperson said that the channel was given a strike for "violating the platform’s harassment policy". Ethan responded later that "[a] few white supremacists successfully lobbied YouTube to suspend me, a Jewish dual citizen of Israel & USA, for antisemitism."

Twitter suspension 
In November 2022, Ethan Klein's Twitter account received a permanent suspension for violating Twitter Terms of Service after impersonating Elon Musk. Klein changed his username to "Elon Musk" and his profile picture to a depiction of him, although noted on his title and header it was a parody account. Twitter's policy on parody, commentary, and fan accounts at the time stated that such accounts are required to clearly distinguish themselves both in the account name and the bio, and that the "account name should clearly indicate that the account is not affiliated with the subject portrayed in the profile." Ethan's was one of several accounts impersonating Musk that received Twitter suspension at the time. Following his suspension, Klein criticized Musk by tweeting from a second Twitter account. The account was unbanned the following month.

Anti-Slapp motion 
The h3h3 podcast was involved in several lawsuits between Triller and Hollywood producer Ryan Kavanaugh beginning in early 2021, most of which thus far have resolved in Klein's favor,while one remains in active litigation.  A recent ruling in the Los Angeles County Superior Court of California found in  Kavanaugh's favor with the judge allowing the anti-slapp motion to proceed, despite Klein's motion to dismiss.  The relevance of this lawsuit could have severe financial implications and be a precedent-setting case for what it claims to be "the weaponization of Klein's h3h3podcast fanbase to damage Kavanaugh's reputation via social media and internet websites designed to post offensive fictitious information about Kavanaugh. The outcome of the lawsuit may have a precedent-setting effect regarding overall online speech and the legal reach of popular internet influencers and their legal accountability for endorsements and statements.

Personal life
Ethan, an American, and Hila, an Israeli, met at the Holocaust memorial Yad Vashem in Israel in 2007 when Ethan was on his Birthright Israel trip, and Hila was serving in the Israel Defense Forces. They married in 2012. During the early years of their YouTube careers, they lived together in Florentin, Tel Aviv, Israel. The Kleins have two sons, Theodore, who was born in June 2019, and Bruce, who was born in February 2022.

In April 2020, the Kleins hosted a 100-day, $100,000 monetary giveaway, to provide aid during the pandemic.

Nominations

References

External links

American podcasters
American YouTubers
Comedy-related YouTube channels
YouTube channels launched in 2011
YouTube podcasters
YouTube controversies
Israeli YouTubers
Israeli Jews
American Jews
Married couples